Margaret Thomas (born 1953), is a female retired British sport shooter.

Sport shooting career
Thomas represented Great Britain at the 1988 Summer Olympics in the women's 10 metre air pistol and the Women's 25 metre pistol at which she shot a (then) personal best.

In September 1990 she set the current British Record (still current in 2022) in the 25m Pistol Women Qualification Stage of 585 at Bisley in the BPC Championships per page 6 of British Shooting Records https://britishshooting.org.uk/media/5151e7be-28da-460c-b6bb-e2a2e7d3263d.pdf

She represented England and won a silver medal in the individual sport pistol event and two bronze medals in the Pairs Events, at the 1994 Commonwealth Games in Victoria, British Columbia, Canada. She won the silver in the 25 metres sport pistol, the first bronze with Carol Page in the 10 metres air pistol pairs and the second bronze in the 25 metres sport pistol pairs, also with Page.

References

Living people
1953 births
British female sport shooters
Commonwealth Games medallists in shooting
Commonwealth Games silver medallists for England
Commonwealth Games bronze medallists for England
Shooters at the 1994 Commonwealth Games
Olympic shooters of Great Britain
Shooters at the 1988 Summer Olympics
20th-century British women
Medallists at the 1994 Commonwealth Games